In Britain, Salmon Letters are official letters sent out by a public inquiry to people that will be subject to criticism when that inquiry's report is released. The aim of the letter is to give the person a chance to prepare for the resultant exposure and possible legal recourse which may need to be taken when allegations against them become public. The letters also serve to inform someone of the allegations they may have to answer to during the tribunal period of that inquiry which may, or may not, become something that is of interest to the public once the report is published.

The letters are so called after Cyril Salmon, Baron Salmon who first conceived of the idea in 1966 when chairing a report into how tribunals of inquiry were to be conducted.

The letters are also known as Maxwellisations after Robert Maxwell, who complained after criticism of his dealings in a public report. Similarly, other reports which have delved further into this process have led to the letters being named after that report, so they have also become known as Crampton Letters (Crampton v Secretary of State for Health 1993) and Scott Compliance (after the Scott Inquiry into the Matrix Churchill Affair (the ‘Arms to Iraq Inquiry’) published in 1996).

In the initial stages of an inquiry, Salmon Letters are often sent out, and if further allegations are made, then more Salmon Letters will be dispatched. This is common to child abuse inquiries, such as the North Wales Child Abuse Inquiry which started in 1996. In the Department for Education's guidelines on the matter (in relation to inquiries where under 18's are involved) the sample letter included, points out to alleged perpetrators that the resultant report has no connection to criminal or any other proceedings.

Salmon Letters have been sent out in most major public inquiries since first being recommended by Baron Salmon in his report Royal Commission on Tribunals of Inquiry (1966). In some cases, particularly the Chilcot Inquiry (into the Iraq war (2003-2010)) it has been cited that the delay in those being criticized responding to allegations, has led (in part) to a delay in the final report. Other inquiries have been noted as demonstrating that adherence to the rules of Salmon Letters has been 'unhelpful' in obtaining clarity (the Scott Report, 1996).

Whilst the 1966 report into the Tribunal Inquiry Process determined that the notification of an allegation was within the fairness of such an inquiry, the responsibility to send the letters out was not enshrined in the Inquiries Act of 2005. However, the Inquiries Rules Act of 2006 allowed, the chairperson of an inquiry to call to the attention that the inquiry will be critical of a person's conduct. This would normally be in the form of a warning letter. The Inquiries Rules Act of 2006 goes further and stipulates that; ...The inquiry panel must not include any explicit or significant criticism of a person in the report, or in any interim report, unless
a. the chairman has sent that person a warning letter; and
b. the person has been given a reasonable opportunity to respond to the warning letter.

Selected inquiries
The table contains a selection of recent public inquiries that employed Salmon Letters as part of that inquiry. The GMC received a letter warning of potential criticism.

References

External links
 Copy of Salmon Letter sent to the solicitors of the South Yorkshire Police in relation to the Hillsborough Enquiry (1989)

Public inquiries in the United Kingdom
United Kingdom commissions and inquiries